Karita Marjatta Mattila (born 5 September 1960) is a Finnish operatic soprano.

Mattila appears regularly in the major opera houses worldwide, including the Metropolitan Opera, the Royal Opera House in London, Théâtre du Châtelet, Opéra Bastille, the Lyric Opera of Chicago, San Francisco Opera, Houston Grand Opera, Vienna State Opera, Toronto Roy Thomson Hall, and Großes Festspielhaus in Salzburg.

Career

Born in Somero, Finland, Mattila graduated 1983 from the Sibelius Academy in Helsinki, where she studied singing with Liisa Linko-Malmio. She then continued her studies with Vera Rózsa in London.

Also in 1983, Mattila won the first Cardiff Singer of the World Competition. In 1985, she made her Royal Opera House, Covent Garden debut as Fiordiligi in Mozart's Così fan tutte.

She was seen as Emma in the first ever televised production of Schubert's Fierrabras at the Vienna State Opera in 1988. In 1990 she made her Metropolitan Opera debut as Donna Elvira in Mozart's Don Giovanni.

In 1994, she made her Spanish debut as Tatyana in Tchaikovsky's Eugene Onegin in Madrid, and 1996 debuts in Paris in Wagner's Lohengrin, Verdi's Don Carlos.

Mattila has won Grammy Awards for "Best Opera Recording" for Die Meistersinger von Nürnberg in 1998 and for Jenůfa in 2004. She was awarded the Evening Standard Ballet, Opera and Classical Music Award for "Outstanding Performance of the Year" in 1998 for her performance of Elisabeth in Don Carlos at the Royal Opera House.

In 2001 The New York Times chose Karita Mattila as the best singer of the year for her performance in Fidelio at the Metropolitan Opera, and in the same year she was nominated for the Laurence Olivier Award "Outstanding Achievement in Opera".

Mattila's 2004 New York performances in Salome and subsequent Káťa Kabanová inspired the New York press to write: "When the history of the Metropolitan Opera around the time of the millennium is written, Karita Mattila will deserve her own chapter."

In 2005, she was named Musician of the Year 2005 by Musical America, which describes her "the most electrifying singing actress of our day, the kind of performer who renews an aging art form and drives the public into frenzies." BBC Music Magazine named Mattila as one of the top 20 sopranos of the recorded era in 2007.

Worldwide audiences saw Mattila in Manon Lescaut live in movie theatres in 2008. Metropolitan's Salome and Tosca were seen live in High Definition worldwide in 2008 and 2009, respectively.

In 2010 at Opéra National de Lyon, Mattila created the role of Émilie du Châtelet in Kaija Saariaho's monodrama Émilie, which was dedicated to her.

In 2014, Mattila was scheduled to sing Four Last Songs with the Munich Philharmonic at Carnegie Hall. However, when Valery Gergiev, who had publicly supported Vladimir Putin's stance on Ukraine and gay rights, was brought in to conduct, she refused to perform if he remained. Gergiev was replaced with Fabio Luisi. Mattila received threats for her action.

In 2020, Mattila played a parody of herself as an opera diva stuck in Finland, in the new comic opera Covid fan tutte.

In December 2020 Mattila was awarded the Order of the Lion of Finland, Commander, First Class.

Personal life
Mattila lives in Naples, Florida. In 1988 she met and, in 1992, married Tapio Kuneinen, who served as her manager; they divorced in February 2019.

She has been active on Twitter since October 2018, and has stated that it was a "lifesaver" after her divorce.

Upon the abrupt cancellation of her Jenůfa at the Royal Opera House in late February 2020 because of the COVID-19 pandemic, she moved to an apartment in Helsinki, Finland, until she was able to travel and work safely again and return home. She returned to Florida in April 2021.

Recordings

Solo recitals
 Arias & Scenes (Erato) cond. Yutaka Sado; Queen of Spades, Jenufa, Elektra.
 German Romantic Arias (Erato), Staatskapelle Dresden, cond. Sir Colin Davis; Beethoven, Weber.
Lieder
 Strauss: Orchestral Songs; Four Last Songs (DG)
 Strauss: Orchestral Songs (Sony Music Entertainment)
 Strauss: Hölderlin Lieder (Sony Music Entertainment)
 Sibelius Songs (Ondine)
 Grieg and Sibelius Songs (Erato)
 Lollipops; Canteloube, Villa-Lobos (Philips)
 Sydän Suomessa – From the Heart of Finland (Ondine), 1996, recital with Ilmo Ranta (piano); songs by Toivo Kuula, Oskar Merikanto, Erkki Melartin, Yrjö Kilpinen and folk songs.
 Wild Rose (Ondine) with Ilmo Ranta. Lieder by Beethoven, Brahms, Schubert, Schumann, Mahler.
 Modern Portrait (Warner/Finlandia), 1995. Paul Hindemith Das Marienleben, song cycle for soprano & piano, Op. 27; Aulis Sallinen Dream Songs; Mikko Heinio song cycle Vuelo de Alambre 
Live
 Karita Live! (Ondine) cond. Jukka Pekka Saraste; Wagner, Verdi, Strauss, Gershwin
 Helsinki Recital (Ondine), Martin Katz (piano); Duparc, Kaija Saariaho Quatre instants, Rachmaninov, Dvořák Gypsy songs.
Compilations
 Excellence – The Artistry of Karita Mattila (Ondine)

Complete operas 
 Salome (Sony Music Entertainment)
 Káťa Kabanová (Fra Musica)
 Tosca (Virgin)
 Manon Lescaut (EMI Classics)
 Don Carlos (EMI Classics)
 Fidelio (DG)
 Die Meistersinger (Decca, DG)
 Simon Boccanegra (TDK)
 Jenůfa (Erato)
 Le nozze di Figaro (Sony Music Entertainment)
 Così fan tutte (Philips)
 Don Giovanni (Philips)
 Fierrabras (DG)
 Der Freischütz (Decca)
 Scenes from Goethe's Faust (Sony Music Entertainment)

Symphonic works 
 Mozart: Requiem (DG)
 Beethoven: Symphony no. 9 (DG)
 Shostakovich: Symphony no. 14 (EMI Classics)
 Schoenberg: Gurrelieder (EMI Classics)
 Bernstein: Symphony no. 3 (Erato)
 Sibelius: Kullervo (BIS)
 Mendelssohn: Symphony no. 2 (DG)
 Schubert: Mass in E flat major; Mozart: Aria of the Angel, Laudate dominum (DG)

Popular music 
 Fever (Ondine)
 Best of Evergreens (Ondine)
 Karita's Christmas (Ondine)
 Songs To The Sea; Popular Melodies by Lasse Mårtenson (2001)

DVDs 
 James Levine's 25th Anniversary Metropolitan Opera Gala (1996), Deutsche Grammophon DVD, B0004602-09

Repertory

References

External links
 Official profile
 Intermusica
 Ondine Records: Biography and discography
 Karita Mattila Forum
 Met Opera Review | "'Salome' Unveils Emotions (and a Soprano)," Anthony Tommasini, New York Times, March 17, 2004
 "Mysteries of Love: Karita Mattila's Salome," Alex Ross, The New Yorker, April 5, 2004
 Interview with Classical Voice
 Karita Mattila's career, roles, CDs and DVDs on Mostly Opera
 Interview with Karita Mattila by Bruce Duffie, January 23, 1991

1960 births
Living people
People from Somero
Finnish operatic sopranos
Grammy Award winners
Sibelius Academy alumni
Commanders First Class of the Order of the Lion of Finland
20th-century Finnish women opera singers
21st-century Finnish women opera singers
Erato Records artists